The 2006–07 Coupe de la Ligue began on 15 August 2006. The final was held on 31 March 2007 at the Stade de France. The eventual winners were Bordeaux who beat Lyon 1-0 in the final.

First round

Second round

Third round

Round of 16

Final draw

Final draw results

Quarter-finals

Semi-finals

Final

Topscorer 
Bafétimbi Gomis (3 goals)

External links
Coupe de La Ligue Ligue de Football Professionnel 

 
Coupe de la Ligue seasons
League Cup
France